Nebria carbonaria is a species of ground beetle in the Nebriinae subfamily that is endemic to Kamchatka, Russia.

References

carbonaria
Beetles described in 1829
Beetles of Asia
Endemic fauna of Kamchatka